Jimmie is a variation of the given name James.

Jimmie may refer to:
 Jimmie Adams (1888–1933), American silent film comedian
 Jimmie Åkesson (born 1979), Swedish politician
 Jimmie Allen (born 1986), American country music singer
 Jimmie Angel (1899–1956), American aviator for whom Angel Falls is named
 Jimmie Davis (1899–2000), singer and two-time Governor of Louisiana
 Jimmie Dodd (1910–1964), master of ceremonies of the television show The Mickey Mouse Club
 Jimmie Fidler (1900–1988), American columnist, journalist, and radio and television personality
 Jimmie Lou Fisher (1941-2022), American politician
 Jimmie Foxx (1907–1967), Hall of Fame Major League Baseball player
 Jimmie Guthrie (1897–1937), Scottish motorcycle racer
 Jimmie Hall (born 1938), Major League Baseball player
 Jimmie Heuga (1943–2010), one of the first two American men alpine skiers to win an Olympic medal 
 Jimmie Johnson (born 1975), American race car driver
 Jimmie Lunceford (1902–1947), American jazz musician and bandleader
 Jimmie Mattern (1905–1988), American aviator
 Jimmie W. Monteith (1917–1944), US Army officer posthumously awarded the Medal of Honor
 Jimmie Nicol (born 1939), temporary replacement drummer with The Beatles
 Jimmie Noone (1895–1944), American jazz clarinetist
 Jimmie Reese (1901–1994), American Major League Baseball player
 Jimmie Rivera (born 1989), American mixed martial artist
 Jimmie Rodgers (country singer) (1897–1933), American singer
 Jimmie Spheeris (1949–1984), American singer and songwriter
 Jimmie Lee Solomon (1956–2020), American lawyer and Major League Baseball executive
 Jimmie Walker (born 1947), American actor and stand-up comedian, star of the television show Good Times
 Jimmie Wilson (1900–1947), American Major League Baseball player and manager, and soccer player

Arts and culture 

 The Chant of Jimmie Blacksmith, a 1972 novel by Thomas Keneally
 The Chant of Jimmie Blacksmith, a 2008 Australian film directed by Fred Schepisi

See also
 James (disambiguation)
 Jim (disambiguation)
 Jimbo (disambiguation)
 Jimmi
 Jimmy (disambiguation)
 Jimi (disambiguation)